The Canon EF-S 10–18mm f/4.5–5.6 IS STM lens is a wide to ultra-wide angle zoom lens for Canon digital single-lens reflex cameras that support the Canon EF-S lens mount. It was announced on May 13, 2014. though it began shipping to retailers by the end of May. It was Canon's 2nd ultra-wide lens with image stabilization to ship to retailers, the first being the EF-M 11–22mm STM. Canon announced a 16–35mm lens with IS on the same day as the 10–18.

References

External links

 Product page on Canon USA website

10-18mm lens
Camera lenses introduced in 2014